Frankford Friends School (also known as FFS) is an independent, coeducational Quaker day school for students in grades Pre-Kindergarten through eight. It is located at 1500 Orthodox Street in the historic Frankford section of Philadelphia, Pennsylvania. Its curriculum focuses on nurturing a growth mindset in students, and enhances its students’ executive functioning, problem-solving, and leadership skills. Frankford Friends School has the lowest tuition of any Quaker school in the Delaware Valley.

Frankford Friends School is accredited by the Pennsylvania Association of Independent Schools (PAIS).

Frankford Friends School is under the care of Frankford Monthly Meeting of Friends, and the Quaker testimonies of simplicity, peace, integrity, community, equality, and stewardship are honored, lived, and learned there. Frankford Friends School students are members of a community that is highly diverse and inclusive. Children of all faiths and all ethnic, racial, and economic backgrounds are welcomed to the community without regard to gender or sexual orientation. Children of color comprise nearly half of the student body.

School highlights

Hands-on, project-based learning

STEM classes for all students in grades PreK-8

Library and Research Skills classes in grades PreK-8

An award-winning Music Program

Spanish for all students in grades PreK-8

Physical Education for all students in grades PreK-8

Service Learning for all students in grades PreK-8

STEM
The STEM program at Frankford Friends School is designed to advance 21st century teaching and learning at Frankford Friends School. Every student in grades PreK-8 participates in open-ended investigations which help them to build skills in problem solving, communication, teamwork, innovation, leadership, and entrepreneurship.

The curriculum emphasizes the inquiry process, critical thought, and creative independence. Students learn to communicate and collaborate more effectively with others using technology to access information and evaluate results. Perseverance and resilience are developed by providing open-ended tasks that require students to generate ideas, explore options, and continually revise their thinking.

Service learning
Frankford Friends School's Service Learning program provides the opportunity for students to connect with each other and the people in their communities, to think critically about issues in the world about them, and to communicate ideas in a creative and appropriate way. Classroom teachers, the service learning teacher, and the community, work to foster a sense of civic responsibility in FFS students, provide diverse and practical “real-world” experiences for their students, and raise awareness of social justice issues.

Early childhood program
Pre-Kindergarten and Kindergarten students enjoy learning through purposeful play, constructive learning activities, information gathering and wondering. They review skills and concepts in math, literacy, handwriting, social studies, and science in one-to-one (teacher/student) or small groups. Classrooms are joyous places for learning, equipped with centers for literacy, science, engineering, manipulative work, sensory play, and exploration.

Lower school program
Children in grades 1-5 are challenged to be curious and inventive. They take responsibility for their learning by taking risks and through working with others. Students acquire literacy skills and mathematical understanding through lessons that integrate science and social studies themes. String instrument lessons begin in fourth grade.

Middle school program
The Middle School program helps students to develop their own identities and discover their passions. By challenging them academically and creatively, students are supported in taking risks and to make meaning of their world. The curriculum also provides a variety of musical and visual arts electives, STEM classes, and foreign language studies, and ensures a solid knowledge base in all curricular areas.

History
The earliest direct predecessor of Frankford Friends School was the one-room “Spring House School,” built by Oxford Meeting in 1768 at the corner of Waln and Spring Streets. It was attended by both Quaker and non-Quaker children. Frankford, along the King's Highway between New York and Philadelphia, was a bustling area, frequently visited by members of the Second Continental Congress, including John Adams, Benjamin Rush, and Thomas Jefferson.

Frankford Friends School was established on its present site in 1833. The school originally served students from pre-Kindergarten through sixth grade. In 1868 the meeting house was enlarged and the second story removed.

Additional classrooms were built above the horse sheds on the property. Sometime during the late 1880s or early 1890s, a new brick schoolhouse was built. In 1924, a social room was added to the rear of the meeting house, and a few years later the porch was enclosed for the use of the Kindergarten.

In the early years of the twenty-first century, grades seven and eight were added to the school, and the first eighth grade class graduated in 2004. In 2012, the Margaret Passmore Trickey building was built to house the expanded Middle School program.

A half acre outdoor classroom/nature-based playscape and a STEM building was added in 2016

References

Schools in Philadelphia
Quaker schools in Pennsylvania
Frankford, Philadelphia